Alida created the world's first CXM & Insights Platform. The company is based in Toronto and is formerly known as Vision Critical. 

It was founded by Andrew Reid in 2000 and worked with numerous brands around the world.

History 

After going to film school and working with interactive companies, Andrew Reid realized that the research industry was behind in technology and started Vision Critical in 2000.

In 2004, Angus Reid, Andrew Reid's father, joined the company. Wellington Capital, a privately held bridge financing and venture debt fund, invested in Alida in October 2006.

In 2009, Alida won the Forrester Groundswell Award with customer NASCAR for the Official NASCAR Fan Council. And in 2011, the company installed its 500th online community.

The company announced that it raised $20 million in funding from OMERS Ventures, the venture capital investment arm of Canadian pension funds company OMERS, in August 2012. In September of the same year, Scott Miller was appointed to group CEO, while Andrew Reid became the Chief Product Officer. Later that year, Alida made the Deloitte Fast 50 for the fifth year in a row.

Alida had about $80 million in revenue in 2012.

In 2018, Alida took home a BIG Innovation Award from the Business Intelligence Group. The firm was ranked Canada's 46th-fastest-growing software development company by PROFIT magazine's PROFIT 500 in 2015. Alida has also taken home awards for its work culture, including the 2017 National HR Award, Achievers 50 Most Engaged Workplaces in North America and Canada's Top Employers for Young People. The company was selected as a "Best Overall SaaS Award" winner by APPEALIE for 2020.

On 24 September 2020, the company announced that Vancouver based Vistara Capital Partners made a $20 million investment in them and that the company was rebranded as Alida.

The company has employees globally. Customers include Banana Republic, Discovery and NASCAR.

Business 
Alida's products include:

 Alida CXM: A platform to empower brands to action customer feedback to constantly foster and deepen brand loyalty and advocacy. Utilizing a configurable rule engine, create and manage cases whilst have complete visibility into key customer experience metrics such as NPS®.
 Alida Sparq: Digital insight communities where companies gain feedback from their customers and stakeholders. Enabling brands to uncover customer truths like motivations, preferences, and beliefs are translated into actionable data points used to deliver world-class design and product experiences.
 Alida Surveys: An enterprise-grade survey application with all of the functionality you need to build a survey, distribute it, and analyze results in an intuitive interface all while providing an engaging respondent experience on desktop and mobile.
 Alida Touchpoint: A mobile-first, cloud-based Microsurvey solution that enables brands to create quick and engaging interactions with their customers to collect context-rich feedback through short, timely, visually appealing interactions across digital customer journeys.
 Alida Analytics: A platform designed to give brands end-to-end visibility into critical customer experience metrics with real-time, customizable, role-based, mobile dashboards that visualize their community and survey respondents, and make it easy to monitor key performance indicators in real-time.

The company has won numerous awards, including being named a Gold winner in the Most Customer Friendly Company of the Year category in the Best in Biz Awards 2013 International competition.

References

Canadian companies established in 2000
Software companies established in 2000
Companies based in Toronto
Software companies of Canada
2000 establishments in Ontario